

Horace Bates (19 August 1793 – 14 December 1879) was an English cricketer who played first-class cricket from 1822 to 1832.

Bates was born at Egerton in Kent in 1793. He was a miller and butcher who played club cricket for Lenham, Leeds and Bearsted sides. He was described as a "tall, strong and heavily built" man who hit the ball powerful but was "by no means to be depended upon".

Primarily a bowler, Bates played in a total of nine first-class matches, five for The Bs and four for Kent sides. He made his first-class debut for The Bs against an England XI in August 1822 at Lord's, and first played for Kent the following season. He took a total of 14 wickets for the B's, playing alongside well-known cricketers such as Billy Beldham and Lord Frederick Beauclerk, although he was less successful in the matches he played for Kent and is known to have taken 20 wickets at first-class level. As well as his first-class matches, Bates is known to have played for the Players of Kent in 1826 and 1827.

Bates married; his wife Elizabeth came from Charing. The couple had seven children. In later life he is described as being an annuitant. He died at Charing in December 1879 aged 86.

Notes

References

Bibliography
Birley D (1999) A Social History of English Cricket. London: Aurum Press. 
Carlaw D (2020) Kent County Cricketers A to Z. Part One: 1806–1914 (revised edition). (Available online at The Association of Cricket Statisticians and Historians. Retrieved 2020-12-21.)

External links

1793 births
1879 deaths
English cricketers
English cricketers of 1787 to 1825
English cricketers of 1826 to 1863
Kent cricketers
The Bs cricketers